Charlos Cove is a small Acadian community in the Canadian province of Nova Scotia, located in the Municipality of the District of Guysborough in Guysborough County.Charlos Cove is a fishing community. In 1760 the first Acadian settlers, came to Charlos Cove.   St. Joseph's Roman Catholic Church built in 1876 is the centre of the community. In 1879 the first school house was built. In 1920 a two-room school was built which today is the parish hall.

References
Charlos Cove on Destination Nova Scotia
 Charlos Cove  History

Communities in Guysborough County, Nova Scotia
General Service Areas in Nova Scotia